Rotherlands is a   Local Nature Reserve in Petersfield in Hampshire. It is owned by  Petersfield Town Council and managed by  Rotherlands Conservation Group.

The River Rother and its tributary, Tilmore Brook, runs through this reserve, and it also has unmanaged grassland, wetland, woodland and scrub. Fauna include badgers, otters and crayfish.

References

Local Nature Reserves in Hampshire